Hannu Juhani Olavi Kaislama (born August 13, 1956 in Suonenjoki) is a retired male boxer from Finland, who represented his native country at the 1980 Summer Olympics in Moscow, Soviet Union. There he lost in the first round of the men's featherweight (– 57 kg) division to East Germany's eventual gold medalist Rudi Fink.

1980 Olympic results
Below is the record of Hannu Kaislama, a Finnish featherweight boxer who competed at the 1980 Moscow Olympics:

 Round of 32: lost to Rudi Fink (East Germany) by decision, 0-5

References
 sports-reference

1956 births
Living people
People from Suonenjoki
Featherweight boxers
Boxers at the 1980 Summer Olympics
Olympic boxers of Finland
Finnish male boxers
Sportspeople from North Savo